Parker v. Brown, 317 U.S. 341 (1943), was a United States Supreme Court case on the scope of United States antitrust law. It held that actions taken by state governments were exempt from the scope of the Sherman Act.

Facts
The case was an appeal from a decree of a district court of three judges enjoining the enforcement, against the appellee, of a marketing program adopted pursuant to the California Agricultural Prorate Act.

Significance

The Supreme Court clarified its position in later judgments.

See also
US antitrust law

Notes

External links

United States antitrust case law
United States Supreme Court cases
United States Supreme Court cases of the Stone Court
1943 in United States case law
United States state sovereign immunity case law